New Faces is a British television talent show that aired in the 1970s and 1980s. It has been hosted by Leslie Crowther, Derek Hobson  and Marti Caine. It was produced for the ITV network by ATV, and later by Central.

Original series: 1973–1978
The show first aired as a pilot on the ATV network on 31 May 1973 with host Leslie Crowther and a judging panel consisting of Noele Gordon, Tony Hatch, Clive James and John Smith assessing performances from ten acts looking for a break in show business. Welsh singer Jennifer Jones won the show that also featured a man who blew up a hot water bottle until it burst followed by a few choruses of "Spanish Eyes".

A further pilot aired on 7 July 1973 with new host Derek Hobson and a full series followed from 29 September 1973 to 2 April 1978. It was recorded at the ATV Centre in Birmingham. The show's theme tune, "You're a Star!", was performed by singer Carl Wayne, formerly of The Move and it was eventually released, becoming a minor hit.

Winners went on to have careers in television entertainment, such as Lenny Henry. Many top entertainers began their careers with a performance on this programme. The acts were evaluated by a panel of experts, including Tony Hatch, Mickie Most, Clifford Davis, Arthur Askey, Ted Ray, Ed Stewart, Jack Parnell, Alan A. Freeman, Muriel Young, Lonnie Donegan, Lionel Blair, Ingrid Pitt, Shaw Taylor, Terry Wogan and Noel Edmonds.

Four judges would make up the panel each week. Contestants received marks out of ten from the four judges in three categories such as "presentation", "content" and "star quality" – The "star quality" category was later replaced by "entertainment value". The highest score any act could attain was thus 120 points. Patti Boulaye was the only act who ever attained the maximum mark, doing so in the programme's final season. Les Dennis received 119 points, with only Tony Hatch giving him less than a perfect '10' for Presentation. Arthur Askey was on the same panel and started singing "Tony is a spoilsport" when Hatch awarded Dennis 9 as his final score.

Series 1–6 Winners

Series One Final (1973)

Series Two Final (1974)

Series Three Final (1975)

Series Five Final (1977)

Series Six Final (1978)

Revived version
The series was revived by Central for three series between 1986 and 1988, presented by past winner, Marti Caine. Her catchphrase was bellowed at the voting studio audience: "Press your buttons... NOW!". The show also featured a panel of experts including the journalist Nina Myskow, who often made critical comments. In this incarnation, the home audience decided who won by sending in postcards (phone voting was soon introduced by BBC rival Bob Says Opportunity Knocks), though, the audience did vote for its favourite act using a gigantic lightboard known as Spaghetti Junction lighting up to a varying degree as they pushed their buttons.

1986 final

Note: The James Stone who appeared in this final is the same one who appeared in the Britain's Got Talent semi-finals of 2008.

1987 final

1988 final

The 1988 final took place at the Birmingham Hippodrome Theatre on Saturday 3 December 1988 and was hosted by the 1975 winner Marti Caine.

Note: Vocalist Tim Murray is the son of 1950s singer Ruby Murray.

Famous winners and contestants

 Jeffrey Hooper – Appeared in the Grand Final of series two in July 1974.
 Marti Caine - Series three winner in July 1975.
 Lenny Henry – Multiple wins in 1975.
 Michael Barrymore
 Joe Pasquale – 2nd in 1987. Pasquale won his heat but he came second in the final.
 Roy Walker
 The Chuckle Brothers – Appeared under the names Paul and Barry Harman in 1974.
 Malandra Burrows – Appeared in the first All Winners Final in November 1974 and was the youngest heat winner at nine years old.
 Carline and Walling
 Nick Van Eede - Appeared in band Twice Bitten. Would later have huge success with Cutting Crew with his song (I Just) Died In Your Arms in 1986 & 1987
 Victoria Wood - Appeared in the first All Winners Final in November 1974.
 Terry St. Clair – Appeared on series two in June 1974.
 Roger De Courcey and Nookie Bear – Winners of the 1976 Grand Final.
 Nicol and Marsh's Easy Street – Runners-up in 1976.
 Mick Miller
 Les Dennis - Appeared in series one, two and twice in series three making the All Winners Final in November 1974.
 Showaddywaddy - Runners-up in the Grand Final of series one in December 1973.

 Jim Davidson
 Gary Wilmot and Judy McPhee
 Billy Pearce
 Aiden J. Harvey - Winner of series two.
 Patti Boulaye – Appeared in the last 1970s edition of the show and was the only contestant ever to receive the maximum 120 points.
 Stevie Riks – Highest scoring contestant ever on the show.
 Max Bacon
 Sweet Sensation – From Manchester and fronted by 15-year-old Marcel King went on to become the first black British born soul band to hit the number spot in UK charts in September 1974 with hit record 'Sad Sweet Dreamer'.
 Andy Cameron
 Sheer Elegance – Pop trio who went on to have two hit singles in 1976.
 Lance Ellington- 1977 winner sang with the late Bet Hannah as singing duo Koffee'n'Kreme.
 Roy 'Chubby' Brown – 10 December 1977.
 Paul Zenon - 21 November 1986.
 Bonnie Tyler - Appeared with her group Imagination in Series Two
 Our Kid - Won an edition in May 1976 and scored a number two hit single on the UK Singles Chart with "You Just Might See Me Cry".

Other winners and contestants
 Penny Black – Extremely popular female fronted five piece band from Walsall. Appeared 4 December 1976 opening the show performing Kiki Dee's "I Got the Music in Me". Penny Black's TV lineup included Tiki Jones (vocals), Barry Underhill (Bass guitar & vocals), Rob Wood (Lead guitar & vocals), Roger Hayward (Hammond organ & vocals), and John Perkins (Drums). An EP was recorded to coincide with the New Faces TV appearance however it was never released. Penny Black performed with various personnel changes with Underhill an ever present from 1974 until 1989 when they changed their name to PARIS and introduced a revamped modern 'romantics' image initiated by their latest female vocalist, Paula Tuckley. Penny Black/PARIS performed around the UK heavily throughout the 70's & 80's establishing a strong fan base. They recorded 'Inside These 4 Walls' written by Underhill/Wood in 1981, with 'Teenager in Love' on the B-side, before disbanding in late 1991, however, Underhill & Wood continued as a duo until 1999. PARIS reformed in July 2012 with the original band members to perform a 'One Night Only' Charity gig in November that year, however the gig was so successful they decided to carry on performing, until Underhill left the band in early 2014 and PARIS finally disbanded shortly afterwards.
 

 The Glentones – 18 piece high school big band playing music from the Glenn Miller era.
 Charlie James – Female singer – Heat winner, December 1973.
 Mike McCabe – Comedian.
 Bokkle Green – Pop music duo from Wolverhampton performing a song written by member Kevin Clark on the 24.11.73 episode. Kevin went on to become a successful musician, songwriter & record producer ("Crush" by Jennifer Paige).
 Martin Berger
 Al Brown – Comedian and father of television personality Claire Sweeney.
 Pete Hartley – Won audience vote in 1987.
 Pete Price
 Dave Curtis – Vocalist.
 Son of a Gun – Won in 1975 with 111 points beating Paul Shane. They did a number of TV shows and were signed to RCA. They lost to Al Dean in the All Winners Final, which also featured Lenny Henry.
 Sparrow
 M3 – Three sisters, Marilyn, Mary and Maureen Stevens. 
 Walker and Cadman
 Professor Steve Green – Pianist and doctor.
 Dragon's Playground – Band.

 David Gold – Vocalist.
 Jimmy Tamley – Beat Joe Pasquale.
 Crick's Canine Wonders
 Darren Stuart.
 Frank Leyton.
 Frank Yonco and Kit Connor.
 The Mad Hatters
 Rabbit – Cabaret band.
 Sandra Christie – Voice of Edith Piaf.
 The Libra Brothers. Three-piece band from Barnsley – members were Frank Cawthrow, Charlie Foster and Gordon Scholey.
 Rod and Mark Lyons – Father and son ventriloquist duo who had a minor hit single in Germany with the Neil Sedaka song "Oh, Carol!".
 Ground Pepper – Band. Song – Draculamania 1 March 1975 series 3 episode 24
 Pyramid - comedy showgroup from Gateshead – Steve Laidlaw, Allen Meche and Brian Pick.
 Colin "fingers" Henry
 Inter-City Union six-piece Soul/Funk group from London.

 The comedy character John Shuttleworth is managed by "Ken Worthington", a fictional Clarinet player and fictional New Faces runner-up.  Worthington's voice is provided by actor Graham Fellows.

Transmissions

ATV

Series 3 was not fully broadcast on Scottish Television, with episodes not being broadcast during the weekends, which resulted in their votes not being counted. Episodes were instead broadcast on a Thursday evening between December 1974 and July 1975.

Central

References

External links
.
New Faces at BFI.
New Faces of '86 at BFI.
New Faces of '87 at BFI.
New Faces of '88 at BFI.
.
You're a Star, Superstar! - The History of New Faces a well researched blog of shows and acts.

1970s British television series
1980s British television series
1973 British television series debuts
1988 British television series endings
Talent shows
Television series by ITV Studios
English-language television shows
ITV reality television shows
Television shows produced by Associated Television (ATV)
Television shows produced by Central Independent Television